The Battle of Flarcheim was fought between German king Henry IV and the German anti-king Rudolf of Swabia on January 27, 1080 near Flarchheim.

Prelude
Rudolf appeared to be vulnerable after losing the support of some of the Saxon princes. Henry decided to take advantage of this vulnerability and marched out against him in the winter of 1079–1080. Rudolf sought out Henry and met him at Flachheim between Eisenach and Mühlhausen in Thuringia.

Battle
Rudolf had arrayed his army on a hill behind a stream. Rather than attack Rudolf and possibly get caught with his forces straddling the stream, Henry opted to march around the obstacle.

Henry struck Rudolf's army from the rear, but with ensuing snowstorm the attack became disorganized. On one hand there are reports of the Saxons being attacked and driven off after duke Vratislaus II of Bohemia cut down the Saxon standard during the snowstorm. Consequently, Vratislaus was able to capture Rudolf's golden lance.

On the other hand, Ekkehard of Aura reports that Otto of Nordheim attacked and plundered Henry's camp before forcing the surrender of the Franconians and the Bohemians. Berthold (possibly Berthold of Ratisbon) states that the armies became separated in the dark and that Rudolf was forced to withdraw to a neighboring village by the cold.

The next day Rudolf returned to the field, but Henry had withdrawn to Franconia.

Notes

References

Flarchheim
Flarchheim
Flarcheim
Flarchheim
Flarchheim
1080 in Europe
Flarchheim
Great Saxon Revolt